The 2005–06 season was the 94th season in the existence of A.C. Rimini 1912 and the club's second consecutive season in the second division of Italian football. In addition to the domestic league, Rimini participated in this season's edition of the Coppa Italia.

Players

First-team squad

Transfers

Pre-season and friendlies

Competitions

Overall record

Serie B

League table

Results summary

Results by round

Matches

Coppa Italia

References

Rimini F.C. 1912 seasons
Rimini